Robin Sterner (born July 1, 1990) is a Swedish professional ice hockey centre who currently plays for Odense Bulldogs of the Danish Metal Ligaen.

External links

Living people
1990 births
Färjestad BK players
Lørenskog IK players
Odense Bulldogs players
Örebro HK players
Rögle BK players
Swedish ice hockey centres
Timrå IK players